Moscow Township is a townships in Muscatine County, Iowa, in the United States. 

Moscow Township was organized in 1842.

References

Townships in Muscatine County, Iowa
Townships in Iowa
1842 establishments in Iowa Territory